Gilmar Estevam (born 11 April 1967) is a retired Brazilian football striker.

References

1967 births
Living people
Brazilian footballers
São Paulo FC players
G.D. Chaves players
Vitória S.C. players
Boavista F.C. players
Brazilian expatriate footballers
Expatriate footballers in Portugal
Brazilian expatriate sportspeople in Portugal
Association football forwards
Footballers from Belo Horizonte